Joshua Weinstein (also known as Precision Tunes) is a New York-based music producer. His pre-release cover version of Maroon 5's "Payphone" made #9 on the UK Singles Chart, selling 34,492 copies. The song also charted at #4 on the Scottish Singles Chart and the UK Indie Chart.

After The Sunday Telegraph tracked him down, he said that "We have currently restructured [PT Records] and its employees, [and] are in the process of issuing takedowns [of our previously released covers] and researching accounting for those releases and plan to relinquish any monies made on the nine releases".

References

Cover artists
Living people
Date of birth missing (living people)
Place of birth missing (living people)
Year of birth missing (living people)